Satkinsky (masculine), Satkinskaya (feminine), or Satkinskoye (neuter) may refer to:
Satkinsky District, a district of Chelyabinsk Oblast, Russia
Satkinskoye Urban Settlement, a municipal formation which the town of Satka in Satkinsky District of Chelyabinsk Oblast, Russia is incorporated as